The 1999–2000 Divizia D was the 58th season of the Liga IV, the fourth tier of the Romanian football league system. The champions of each county association promoted to Divizia C without promotion play-off.

County leagues

Arad County

Harghita County

Iași County 
 Championship final  

Viitorul Pașcani won the 1999–2000 Divizia D Iași County and promoted to Divizia C.

Mureș County

Neamț County

See also 
 1999–2000 Divizia A
 1999–2000 Divizia B

References

External links
 FRF

Liga IV seasons
4
Romania